Ali'imalemanu Alofa Tuuau is a Samoan politician and member of the Legislative Assembly of Samoa. She is a member of the Human Rights Protection Party.

Ali'imalemanu was an accountant before entering politics. She had worked as chief accountant for the Samoa Public Trust Office for thirteen years, as a finance manager for the University of the South Pacific in Fiji for thirteen years, and then as finance manager for the South Pacific Regional Environment Programme (SPREP) in Samoa, where she had worked for fourteen years.

Tuuau was elected to Parliament in the 2016 Samoan general election, representing the constituency of Alataua West. She served as Chair of Parliamentary Committee for Finance and Expenditure. She lives in Apia, but regularly returns to her village on the island of Savai'i.

Ali'imalemanu has said of women's empowerment: "I don't believe in this saying, 'promoting equal rights', because there are equal rights of women everywhere but it's just that they are not using it" and suggested "we are the problem because we put ourselves down. When I was growing up until I started working, I never struggled because of the non-equal rights...It is us. We don't use it and we have no self-confidence, but it is an issue that we can deal with because it's easy." In parliament, she criticised the language a proposed constitutional amendment that would officially define Samoa as a Christian state on the basis that it was "insufficient, as it apparently lacks real power to limit the spread of potentially fanatical denominations within the country".

Tuuau lost her seat in the 2021 election, but was declared elected on 20 April 2021 by Samoa's electoral commission due to the requirement that a minimum of 10% of seats in parliament must be held by women. On 17 May 2021, the appointment was overturned by the Supreme Court of Samoa.

Following the 2021 Samoan by-elections Tuuau was again appointed to Parliament under the women's quota as an additional member for Alataua West. However, the Speaker of the Legislative Assembly decided to postpone her swearing in until all legal matters regarding it were settled. The Supreme Court later ruled against the speaker's decision and Ali'imalemanu was sworn in 17 May 2022.

Notes

References

Members of the Legislative Assembly of Samoa
Samoan women in politics
Human Rights Protection Party politicians
21st-century women politicians
Accountants
Women accountants